Taleeb Farouk Noormohamed  (born October 8, 1976) is a Canadian politician and technology executive who has been the member of Parliament (MP) for Vancouver Granville since 2021, sitting as a Liberal.

Education and career 
Noormohamed completed a Bachelor of Arts degree from Princeton University. He later earned a master's degree from Harvard University and attended Oxford University for his doctoral studies. Noormohamed’s advisor at Princeton was Nobel Laureate Toni Morrison, about whom Noormohamed would write in the Journal of Blacks in Higher Education and in a letter to Time magazine.

After completing his degree, Noormohamed worked for the federal government, first at the Privy Council Office, and then for Public Safety Canada, where he was the director of the review of the bombing of Air India Flight 182. He proceeded to serve as the Director of Partnerships for the 2010 Winter Olympics which were held in Vancouver.

Following the Olympics, Noormohamed was appointed by the Government of British Columbia to conduct a review of the province’s service delivery model. The review found substantial areas of improvement and much of the report was subsequently redacted by the provincial government.

From 2011 until his election in 2021, he held senior executive roles in with a number of technology firms including Farfetch and VRBO. From 2018 to 2021, he was appointed to the board of directors for the Canadian Air Transport Security Authority (CATSA).

Noormohamed serves as a governor of the Confederation Centre of the Arts and as an advisory board member of the MacEachen Institute of Public Policy. He has served on the boards of Covenant House Vancouver, The Lions Gate Hospital Foundation, the Koerner Foundation, and the Leukemia and Lymphoma Society.

He is a recipient of the Queen's Diamond Jubilee Medal, the Sovereign's Medal for Volunteers.

Political career

2011 and 2019 federal elections 
In the 2011 federal election, Noormohamed unsuccessfully ran as the Liberal candidate in North Vancouver. He also ran in the 2019 federal election as the Liberal candidate in Vancouver Granville, however, he lost to incumbent Jody Wilson-Raybould who was elected as a Liberal but ran as an independent candidate.

2018 Vision Vancouver mayoral candidacy 
In 2018, Noormohamed announced his candidacy for the leadership of municipal political party Vision Vancouver, where a victory would effectively make Noormohamed the party's mayoral candidate in municipal elections.

He described the party as a "big tent for people who share centrist values", and cited his work helping start up companies as his inspiration for running in the race. He expressed a desire to improve transit and address the housing crisis through working with community organizations and exploring multi-generational housing. The Toronto Star raised questions about Noormohamed's extensive work history as an executive for short-term rental sites HomeAway (now Vrbo) and Tripping.com, to which Noormohamed responded by pointing out HomeAway's focus on vacation rentals rather than urban apartments.

In a Facebook message posted eight days after announcing his candidacy, Noormohamed stated he had been hospitalized after a "sudden cardiac event" and on the advice of doctors, made the difficult decision to "end this nomination campaign". At that time, he put his support behind the other Vision Vancouver candidate, Ian Campbell.

2021 federal election 
Noormohamed once again ran for the Liberal Party in Vancouver Granville during the 2021 federal election.

Initial news reports prompted criticism of Noormohamed when they revealed his purchase and sale of 4 properties within the previous 4 years. He deflected concerns by suggesting the home purchases were intended for family members or himself, and when those plans  fell through for various reasons, he was obliged to sell the properties.

Days later, new information revealed Noormohamed had purchased and sold a total of 41 properties in Vancouver since 2005, with 21 of those transactions taking place in under a year - a practice known as "flipping".
The Federal NDP Party released BC Assessment records and an accompanying spreadsheet showing Noormohamed’s real estate speculation had netted almost $5 million since 2005 and nearly $3.7 million in the previous 6 years alone.

During the election campaign, Prime Minister Justin Trudeau, the Liberal leader, promised to introduce an anti-flipping tax as well as other anti-speculation measures. Noormohamed initially avoided questions on income he earned from flipping houses when asked if he had declared those as his principal residence, which would make gains on their sale non-taxable. He later stated, "I have always followed the appropriate rules around this." In an interview with CTV, Noormohamed declined to provide details on how much he had profited from a decade of home sales .

Subsequent to these news reports, Noormohamed was not in attendance  at a September 13 all-candidates meeting for Vancouver South and Vancouver-Granville, hosted by the Jewish Seniors Alliance, Marpole Oakridge Family Place, South Vancouver Seniors Network, South Granville Seniors Centre, COSCO BC, and the BC Health Coalition.
In addition, Noormohamed did not attend an all candidates meeting hosted by the Vancouver Unitarians on September 14, nor did he attend an on-air panel hosted by the local CBC radio affiliate on September 17.

During an interview on election eve, Noormohamed answered "No" to the question of whether he would continue the practice of real estate speculation if he won the seat.

Disclosure summary 2022 
In August of 2022, Noormohamed's disclosures indicated ownership of shares in a wide variety of companies, as well as multiple rental properties.

In Parliament 
Noormohamed is the first Muslim MP to be elected in British Columbia.

Noormohamed is a member of the Standing Committee on Public Safety and National Security (SECU) and the Standing Joint Committee for the Scrutiny of Regulations (REGS). He is also chair of the Liberal's Pacific Caucus.

Electoral record

References

External links 
 

Living people
Liberal Party of Canada MPs
Members of the House of Commons of Canada from British Columbia
Politicians from Vancouver
21st-century Canadian politicians
Princeton University alumni
Harvard Graduate School of Education alumni
Alumni of the University of Oxford
1976 births